Marian Walentynowicz (born 20 January 1896 in Saint Petersburg, Russian Empire, died 26 August 1967 in Warsaw, Poland) was a Polish graphic artist, architect, teacher, writer and a precursor to the comic book in Poland.

He is probably best known for his collaboration as illustrator with Kornel Makuszyński in their creation of Koziołek Matołek, a popular classic children's series about a billy goat.

Life
Walentynowicz studied Architecture at the Warsaw Polytechnic. During the 1930s he taught at the Women's Architectural Academy in Warsaw. From the 1920s onwards he worked as an illustrator for various Warsaw publications. During the Second world war, he was the war correspondent attached to General Stanisław Maczek's 
First Panzer division. While with the Polish Forces, Walentynowicz stayed in London prior to the Normandy landings. The army had a quandary what to do with a Lieutenant who was a qualified architect, with insufficient knowledge of war craft. 'Make me a general', he suggested laconically and promptly was turned into a journalist.

Graphic legacy

He designed the emblem of the Independent Polish Parachute Brigade as well as the awards for the Brigade's heroes.
He was a prolific book illustrator. Among his jacket designs was the wartime edition of Józef Kisielewski's , The Earth Gathers Dust. His children's book illustrations include:

With Kornel Makuszyński:
 1933  Koziołek Matołek (120 adventures of Koziołek Matołek), on account of the 120 drawings, each with a caption in a quatrain.

With other authors:
 , a comic book with text by Ryszard Kiersnowski, published in 1957 by the weekly review for young people, in a series of 49 whole page comic strips.
 , 1956, The Adventures of Professor Ladybird

Some of the stories have been turned into well loved TV and feature film animations.

Literary output
Aside from his collaborations with other authors, Marian Walentynowicz also published his own work:
 , stories published in the review 
  1969, war reminiscences

See also
 Pacanów
 List of Polish people
 The Adventures of Tintin

Bibliography

With Kornel Makuszyński:
 1933  Koziołek Matołek (120 adventures of Koziołek Matołek) on account of the 120 drawings, each with a caption in a quatrain.
 1933 , The Second Book of Koziołek Matołek's Adventures
 1934 , The Third Book of Koziołek Matołek's Adventures
 1934 , The Fourth Book of Koziołek Matołek's Adventures
 1935 , Rows and japes of the little monkey, Fiki-Miki
 1936 , More Fiki-Miki Adventures, all readers laugh
 1937 , About the Wawel Dragon
 1938 , Wanda lies in our earth
 1938 , No Use Crying and Screaming, this is the End of Fiki-Miki's Adventures
 1960  (Collected edition, Legends of Kraków, about the Wawel Dragon and Wanda)
 1964 , complete edition
 1969 , Collected edition of Koziołek Matołek's Adventures

References

External links 

1896 births
1967 deaths
20th-century Polish painters
20th-century Polish male artists
Architects from Warsaw
Polish designers
Polish comics artists
Polish cartoonists
Polish illustrators
Polish caricaturists
Polish military personnel of World War II
Artists from Warsaw
Warsaw University of Technology alumni
Academic staff of the Warsaw University of Technology
Burials at Powązki Cemetery
Polish male painters